Jef Tavernier (born 1 November 1951 in Aalter, East Flanders, Belgium) is a Belgian politician. He was once member of the party Green! (Groen!).

Career
24/11/1991 – 12/04/1995:  Senator [directly elected] (constituency Ghent–Eeklo)
07/01/1992 – 21/05/1995:  Flemish Council member
21/05/1995 – 28/08/2002:  Representative (constituency Ghent–Eeklo)
28/08/2002 – 18/07/2003:  Federal minister for Consumer Affairs, Public Health and Environment (replaced Magda Aelvoet)
18/02/2004 – 21/07/2004:  Flemish minister for Environment, Agriculture and Development Cooperation
13/06/2004 – 07/06/2009:  Flemish representative (constituency West Flanders)

References

1955 births
Living people
Groen (political party) politicians
Ghent University alumni